Horst Spengler (born 10 February 1950 in Gießen-Lützellinden, Hesse) is a former West German handball player who competed in the 1976 Summer Olympics.

In 1976, he was part of the West German team which finished fourth in the Olympic tournament. He played all six matches and scored ten goals.

After his player career, he was team coach for HSG Wetzlar and SG Wallau.

References

1950 births
Living people
Sportspeople from Giessen
German male handball players
Olympic handball players of West Germany
Handball players at the 1976 Summer Olympics